The following is the discography of rock group The Lightning Seeds.

Albums

Studio albums

Compilation albums

Singles

Music videos

References

Discographies of British artists
Rock music group discographies